National Taipei University of Business (NTUB), formerly known as National Taipei College of Business (NTCB), is a national co-educational college located in Taipei City and Taoyuan City, Taiwan. Colloquially called Beishang (北商), it is the first and oldest college specializing in business and finance in Taiwan - university of business UB. NTUB boasts a history of almost 100 years. The University has been named the top school for finance related studies in Taiwan. The number of alumni has reached hundreds of thousands. Most of them work in business and industrial sectors.

Academics

College of Management
Department of Business Administration & Graduate Institute of Business Administration 
Institute of Information and Decision Sciences
Department of Information Management
Department of Applied Foreign Languages
College of Business
Department of Accounting and Information Systems(with Graduate Institute of Accounting and Taxation)
Department of International Business(with Graduate Institute of International Business)
Department of Finance; Graduate school of Finance
Department of Public Finance and Tax Administration
Master's Program in Law and Negotiation for Global Trade(MBA in Trade Negotiations and Legal Studies)
College of Innovative Management
Department of Commercial Creativity Management 
Department of Digital Multimedia Design
Department of Commercial Design and Management

Partner Universities and International Cooperation

United States
University of Minnesota, Crookston Campus
Hawaii Pacific University
Frostburg State University
Pittsburg State University
University of Texas at Arlington
Southern Utah University
California State University, Monterey Bay

Canada
Medicine Hat College

United Kingdom
Queen's University Belfast
Nottingham Trent University
De Montfort University
Sheffield Hallam University

France
Neoma Business School
Lille Catholic University
Montpellier Business School

Germany
University of Siegen
Aschaffenburg University of Applied Sciences
Neu-Ulm University of Applied Sciences
Rhine-Waal University of Applied Sciences
University of Applied Sciences Kaiserslautern

Austria
IMC University of Applied Sciences Krems
Fachhochschule Kufstein Tirol University of Applied Sciences

Netherlands
Saxion University of Applied Sciences
Avans University of Applied Sciences
Hanze University of Applied Sciences, Groningen

Hungary
Budapest Business School

Japan
Chiba University of Commerce

South Korea
Kyungpook National University
KwangWoon University
Chonbuk National University
Catholic University of Korea
University of Ulsan

China
Central University of Finance and Economics
China University of Political Science and Law
Southwest University
Jinan University
Chongqing University
Beijing Foreign Studies University
Soochow University
Hong Kong Baptist University School of Business

New Zealand
University of Auckland

Australia
La Trobe University
University of Technology Sydney
University of Canberra

Vietnam
Hanoi University

Thailand
Siam University

Indonesia
University of Indonesia

Mongolia
Global Leadership University

Alumni
Frank Hsieh - former mayor of Kaohsiung and presidential candidate
Wang Chien-shien - president of Control Yuan (2008–2014)
Chang Yung-fa - chairman and founder of Evergreen Marine
Vivian Hsu - Taiwanese Mandopop singer
Wayne Pai - founder of Polaris Group, second largest securities brokerage in Taiwan

External links

Official website 
Official website 

1917 establishments in Taiwan
Educational institutions established in 1917
Universities and colleges in Taipei
Universities and colleges in Taiwan
Technical universities and colleges in Taiwan